John Richmond may refer to:

 John P. Richmond (1811–1895), American Methodist missionary
 John Richmond (diplomat) (1909–1990), British diplomat and author
 John Richmond (fashion designer) (born 1960), English fashion designer
 John Richmond (English footballer) (1938–2018), English footballer
 John Richmond (Australian footballer) (born 1943), Australian rules footballer
 John Richmond (lawyer) (1765–1846), friend of Robert Burns the poet
 John Richmond (shortstop) (1855–1898), American Major League Baseball shortstop
 John Lee Richmond (1857–1929), American Major League Baseball pitcher
 Eli the Eliminator (real name John Richmond, born 1958), American professional wrestler